Upper Harbledown is a village in Harbledown and Rough Common civil parish about  west of Canterbury, Kent, England.  The population is roughly 400.

History
The village lies on or very close to the ancient trackway known as Watling Street. This became the main A2 road from London to Canterbury and Dover, which ran through the centre of the village before it was bypassed.

Amenities
The village has a village green, a children's play area, and a village hall. It did have a public house, The Plough, and a garden centre, but these have both closed down.

References

External links

Villages in Kent
City of Canterbury